The Office of Works was established in the English royal household in 1378 to oversee the building and maintenance of the royal castles and residences.  In 1832 it became the Works Department forces within the Office of Woods, Forests, Land Revenues, Works and Buildings.  It was reconstituted as a government department in 1851 and became part of the Ministry of Works in 1940.

The organisation of the office varied; senior posts included Surveyor of the King's Works (1578–1782) and Comptroller of the King's Works (1423–1782). In 1782 these offices were merged into Surveyor-General and Comptroller.  From 1761 there were named Architects.  The office also had posts of Secretary, Master Mason and Master Carpenter.

After James Wyatt's death in 1813 a non-professional Surveyor-General was appointed: Major-General Sir Benjamin Stephenson. He was assisted by three "Attached Architects": Sir John Soane, John Nash and Sir Robert Smirke. This arrangement ended in 1832 with the formation of the Works Department, when architect Henry Hake Seward was appointed Surveyor of Works and Buildings.

Surveyor of the King's Works

 1578–1590 Thomas Blagrave
 1594–1595 Robert Adams
 1597–1604 William Spicer
 1604–1606 David Cunninghame of Robertland
 1606–1615 Simon Basil
 1615–1643 Inigo Jones
 1643–1653 Edward Carter
 1653–1660 John Embree
 1660–1669 Sir John Denham
 1669–1718 Christopher Wren
 1718–1719 William Benson
 1719–1726 Sir Thomas Hewett
 1726–1737 Richard Arundell
 1737–1743 Henry Fox
 1743–1760 Henry Finch
 1760–1768 Thomas Worsley
 1779–1782 Whitshed Keene

Comptroller of the King's Works

 1423–1452 Robert Shiryngton
 1456–1461 Peter Idley
 1597–1606 Simon Basil
 1606–1641 Thomas Baldwin
 1641–1668 James Wethered
 1668–1684 Hugh May
 1689–1702 William Talman
 1702–1726 John Vanbrugh
 1726–1758 Thomas Ripley
 1758–1769 Henry Flitcroft
 1769–1782 William Chambers

Surveyor-General and Comptroller
 1782–1796 William Chambers
 1796–1813 James Wyatt

Deputy Surveyor
 1718–1719 Colen Campbell (dismissed)
 1719–1735 Westby Gill (promoted)
 1735–1748 William Kent (died in post)
 1748–1758 Henry Flitcroft (promoted)
 1758–1780 Stephen Wright (died in post)
 1780–1782 Robert Taylor

Surveyor of the King's Private Roads
 1660–1690 Andrew Lawrence
 1690–1715 Michael Studholme
 1716–1731 William Watkins
 1731–1737 Richard Arundell
 1737–1756 Thomas Ripley
 1756–1757 John Offley
 1757–1760 Sir Henry Erskine, 5th Baronet
 1760–1771 Hon. Edward Finch
 1771–1772 Thomas Whateley
 1772–1782 Hon. Henry Fane

Surveyor of Royal Gardens
 1660–1670 Adrian May
 1670–1684 Hugh May

Superintendent of all the King's Gardens
 1689–1700 William Bentinck, 1st Earl of Portland
 1700–1702 Richard Jones, 1st Earl of Ranelagh

Surveyor of Gardens and Waters
 1715–1726 John Vanbrugh
 1726–1737 Charles Dartiquenave
 1738–1760 Thomas Hervey
 1761–1763 George Onslow, 1st Earl of Onslow
 1763–1763 Lord Charles Spencer
 1763–1764 John Marshe Dickinson
 1764–1769 Charles Cadogan, 1st Earl Cadogan
 1770–1782 William Varey

Paymaster of the Works
 1660–1668 Hugh May
 1668–1686 Philip Packer
 1686–1706 Thomas Lloyd 
 1706–1726 Charles Dartiquenave
 1726–1738 Hugh Howard
 1738–1741 John Harris
 1741–1742 Sir Robert Brown, 1st Baronet
 1742–1743 Sir Charles Gilmour, 2nd Baronet
 1743–1755 Denzil Onslow
 1755–1782 George Augustus Selwyn

Architect of the Works
 1761–1769 Sir William Chambers
 1761–1769 Robert Adam
 1769–1777 Sir Robert Taylor
 1769–1782 James Adam
 1777–1780 Thomas Sandby
 1780–1782 James Paine

Secretary to the Board of Works
 1715–1718 Nicholas Hawksmoor
 1718–1719 Benjamin Benson
 1719–1726 John Hallam
 1726–1736 Nicholas Hawksmoor
 1736–1766 Isaac Ware
 1766–1775 William Robinson
 1775–1782 Kenton Couse

References

Sources
 H. M. Colvin, A Biographical Dictionary of British Architects, 1600-1840 (1997) 
 H. M. Colvin, The History of the King's Works, London: H.M.S.O. (1963–1982)
 
  (v.3,pt 1)
  (v.4,pt 2)
  (v.5)
  (v.6)
  (Plans 5-7)

External links
 Parliamentary Archives, Records of the Office of Works, 1378-1940

1378 establishments in England
Works
Material culture of royal courts